Summer Holiday (夏日的麼麼茶) is a 2000 Hong Kong romantic comedy film directed by Jingle Ma and starring Richie Jen and Sammi Cheng.

The film earned HK$21,336,647 at the Hong Kong box office, becoming the second highest-grossing local film after Needing You... in Hong Kong of 2000. It was nominated in four categories at the 20th Hong Kong Film Awards, including Best cinematography for Chan Kwok-Hung, Best Art Direction for Silver Cheung, Best Original film Score for Peter Kam and Best Original Film Song for Jen, Ah Niu and Michael Wong.

Cast
Richie Jen as Momocha
Sammi Cheng as Summer Koo
Vincent Kok as Summer's boss
Echo Chen as YoYo
Ah Niu (Tan Kheng Seong) as Hercules
Michael Wong as Zeneger
Tay Ping Hui as George
Katherine Wang as Yau
Tam Fung-ling as Daisy
Chow Siu-yin as Secretary
Chan Pui-hing as Groom
Cheung Wai-kuen as Pastor
Chan Yi-yi as May
Mak Kwai-yuen as Roger
Wong Chi-hong as Mr. Chan
Yu Chung-yik as Tarzan
Yeung Ying-choi as Snake
Yip Cho-yau as Elephant
Ankee Leung as Tarzan's worker
Yamada Rena as Takagi
Seung Yik-san as Tommy
Wyman Yeung as Fake George
Siu Yee-ting as Tarzan's girlfriend
Jeffrey Wong as Policeman #1
Wan Kin-fai as Policeman #2
Tam Wai-ching as Receptionist
Chan Wing-chi as Polaris Investment's boss
Charlie Hau as Polaris Investment's executive
Ng Suk-sam as Summer's lawyer

Filming locations
The movie was shot primarily in Redang island off the coast of the state of Terengganu, Malaysia

External links

2000 films
2000 romantic comedy films
Hong Kong romantic comedy films
2000s Cantonese-language films
Films directed by Jingle Ma
Golden Harvest films
Films set in Malaysia
Films shot in Malaysia
Films set on beaches
Films set on islands
2000s Hong Kong films